KYMB-LD, virtual and UHF 
digital channel 27, is a low-powered MeTV-affiliated television station licensed to Monterey, California, United States. Founded 1989, the station is owned by Monterey Bay Television LLC. Comcast carries KYMB-DT1 on channel 19 in the Monterey Bay Area and Santa Cruz County.

History
Signing on as K53DT, the station was owned by the Trinity Broadcasting Network and broadcast programming from TBN for many years on channel 53. With the FCC's move to reassign UHF channels 52 to 69 to other services, K53DT moved to channel 27 in 2005 and took on the call sign of K27IE.

In 2007, TBN sold the station to Cocola Broadcasting Companies LLC, which then renamed the station into its present-day callsign. In April 2010, Cocola Broadcasting Companies moved the license to Monterey Bay Television LLC, which is now the license holder of KYMB.

On April 26, 2006, the station received a construction permit to flash-cut operations to digital television. On March 8, 2009, KYMB began broadcasting in digital with an effective radiated power of 5 kilowatts.

In 2011, KYMB became an affiliate of the MeTV network.

Digital channels
The station's digital signal is multiplexed:

References

External links
Official site
Local listings

This TV affiliates
GetTV affiliates
Buzzr affiliates
YMB-LD
MeTV affiliates
Television channels and stations established in 1989
Low-power television stations in the United States